Errol Stewart (born 2 March 1950) is a Jamaican former sprinter who competed in the 1968 Summer Olympics. He was born in Kingston, Jamaica. He was also a gold medallist at the 1970 British Commonwealth Games with the Jamaican 4×100 metres relay team.

References

1950 births
Living people
Sportspeople from Kingston, Jamaica
Jamaican male sprinters
Olympic athletes of Jamaica
Athletes (track and field) at the 1968 Summer Olympics
Commonwealth Games gold medallists for Jamaica
Commonwealth Games medallists in athletics
Athletes (track and field) at the 1970 British Commonwealth Games
Medallists at the 1970 British Commonwealth Games